Prince Waldemar of Schaumburg-Lippe (German: Waldemar Stephan Ferdinand Wolrad Friedrich Karl Prinz zu Schaumburg-Lippe; 19 December 1940 – 11 August 2020) was a German-born banker and member of the House of Schaumburg-Lippe. He was a twice great-grandson of Frederick VIII of Denmark; as such, he was a twice second cousin of Margrethe II of Denmark.

Life
Prince Waldemar was born in Germany in 1940. Queen Alexandrine of Denmark was among his godparents. At the age of five, he moved to Denmark to live with his maternal aunt and uncle, Princess Caroline-Mathilde and Prince Knud. At the age of 10, he returned to West Germany. He later trained as a banker.

In 1977, he moved to Denmark once again and became a Danish citizen upon marrying Anne-Lise Johansen, the court photographer of his twice second cousin, Margrethe II. In 1991, Johansen told her husband she had taken a lover and intended to divorce him. He left Denmark for good following his divorce and was charged with illegal possession of a weapon after threatening to shoot his ex-wife and her lover. Johansen died in 1994. Due to the scandal his divorce and criminal charges caused, Prince Waldemar was no longer invited to the Danish court.

Prince Waldemar died on 11 August 2020 in the United States at the age of 79.

Marriage and issue
Prince Waldemar first married Anne-Lise Johansen (Copenhagen, 8 August 1946 - Dronningmølle, 27 July 1994) in Karlebo on 10 September 1977. They divorced in 1991. They had one daughter: 
 Princess Eleonore-Christine Eugenie Benita Feodora Maria of Schaumburg-Lippe (born 22 December 1978 in Hørsholm, Denmark)

He married secondly Karin Grundmann (9 December 1962) in Hamburg on 15 May 2001. They divorced in 2002. They had no children. 

He married thirdly Ruth Schneidewind (4 August 1949) in Wilhelmshaven, Lower Saxony, in 2002. They divorced in 2003. They had no children. 

Prince Waldemar married fourthly Gertraud Antonia Schöppl (21 September 1956) on 20 September 2008 at Schönbrunn Palace, Vienna. He adopted the adult son of his wife: 
 Mario-Helmut Wagner (b. 23 December 1977). He legally changed his given name to Mario Max Prince Antonius Adolf Albert Eduard Oliver Gertraud Edith Helga Magdalena Prinz zu Schaumburg-Lippe 

Alexander, Prince of Schaumburg-Lippe, the head of Waldemar's dynasty, issued a statement proclaiming his disapproval of his fourth marriage and the adoption of his stepson.

Ancestry

Notes

Citations

Bibliography

External links

 Statement issued by the Head of the Schaumburg-Lippe family about the marriage between Prince Waldemar of Schaumburg-Lippe and Gertraud-Antonia Wagner-Schöppl, 19.09.2008 - website Schloss Bueckeburg (in German)
 

1940 births
2020 deaths
House of Lippe
Princes of Schaumburg-Lippe